Camptibia is a genus of assassin bugs (insects in the family Reduviidae) in the subfamily Harpactorinae. It is reported from China. The lone species is Camptibia obscura.

References

Reduviidae
Cimicomorpha genera
Monotypic Hemiptera genera
Arthropods of China